Ulrich Lind (born 4 November 1942 in Heilbronn) is a German former sport shooter who competed in the 1976 Summer Olympics, the 1984 Summer Olympics, and the 1988 Summer Olympics.

References

1942 births
Living people
German male sport shooters
ISSF rifle shooters
Olympic shooters of West Germany
Shooters at the 1976 Summer Olympics
Shooters at the 1984 Summer Olympics
Shooters at the 1988 Summer Olympics
Olympic silver medalists for West Germany
Olympic medalists in shooting
Medalists at the 1976 Summer Olympics
Sportspeople from Heilbronn
20th-century German people